The Sunday Examiner is an English newspaper owned and operated by the Roman Catholic Diocese of Hong Kong. The newspaper is published weekly on every Sunday in the Catholic parishes in Hong Kong. The newspaper, along with Kung Kao Po, are the official publications that are published by the Diocese.

See also
Media in Hong Kong
List of newspapers in Hong Kong
Newspaper Society of Hong Kong
Hong Kong Audit Bureau of Circulations

External links
Sunday Examiner—Official website.

Roman Catholic Diocese of Hong Kong
English-language newspapers published in Hong Kong
Publications with year of establishment missing
Catholic newspapers